Broaryd is a locality situated in Gislaved Municipality, Jönköping County, Sweden with 271 inhabitants in 2010.

References 

Populated places in Jönköping County
Populated places in Gislaved Municipality
Finnveden